Zachary Lloyd Shallcross (born July 31, 1996) is an American television personality who appeared on season 19 of The Bachelorette, and starred in season 27 of The Bachelor.

Early life and education 
Shallcross was born in Fullerton, California to parents Chapman and Megan Shallcross, and was raised in nearby Anaheim Hills. He has two younger sisters, Sammy and Payton, and his uncle is actor Patrick Warburton. His father Chapman was the fire captain of the Orange City Fire Department until his retirement in 2020.

Shallcross graduated from Servite High School in 2014, and then played football at California Polytechnic State University in San Luis Obispo, where he was an honors student for four years. He graduated from Cal Poly in 2019 with a degree in business administration.

Career 
Prior to appearing on The Bachelorette, Shallcross was a sales account executive for software company Oracle in Austin, Texas.

Reality television

The Bachelorette 

In March 2022, Shallcross was revealed to be a contestant on season 19 of The Bachelorette starring Rachel Recchia and Gabby Windey. He exclusively pursued Recchia, and ultimately finished in third place in her group of men.

The Bachelor 

On September 14, 2022, it was reported that Shallcross is set to lead season 27 of The Bachelor. It was made official on September 20, during the live Bachelorette season 19 finale.

References

External links

1996 births
Living people
Bachelor Nation contestants
Servite High School alumni
Cal Poly Mustangs football players
People from Anaheim Hills, California
Sportspeople from Fullerton, California